Zephyr is the debut album by the band Zephyr, released in 1969.

Track listing

Side one
"Sail On" (Tommy Bolin, Candy Givens) – 7:22
"Sun's a Risin'" (Bolin, David Givens) – 4:45
"Raindrops" (Dee Clark) – 2:40
"Boom-Ba-Boom" (D. Givens) – 1.20
"Somebody Listen" (D. Givens, C. Givens, Bolin, John Faris) – 6:10

Side two
"Cross the River" (C. Givens, D. Givens) – 4:43
"St. James Infirmary" (Joe Primrose) – 5:15
"Huna Buna" (C. Givens, Bolin) – 2:26
"Hard Chargin' Woman" (Bolin, Robbie Chamberlin, Faris, C. Givens, D. Givens) – 8:40

Personnel 
Candy Givens – lead vocals, harmonica
Tommy Bolin – guitar, backing vocals
John Faris – organ, piano, flute
David Givens – bass, backing vocals
Robbie Chamberlin – drums, backing vocals

With:
Bill Halverson – production, engineering
Alden Spillman & William Shepard – cover design

References

1969 debut albums
Zephyr (band) albums
Albums recorded at Wally Heider Studios